The Fortunate Ones may refer to:

 Fortunate Ones, Canadian band
 The Fortunate Ones (Ghost in the Shell), television episode